The Barfoot & Thompson Auckland Marathon and Half Marathon is an annual running event held in Auckland, New Zealand.  The event is held in October or early November of each year, which is during the spring in New Zealand. The main feature of the event is the crossing of the Auckland Harbour Bridge, which involves a climb of 33 metres to the highest point.

History 

The first Auckland Marathon was held in June 1936, using an Auckland waterfront course. The race did not become an annual event until 1949, or the 1960s, or until 1992 if the Great Northern Marathon (Takanini) events are not regarded as the Auckland Marathon editions of 1989 to 1991, and it was not until October 1992 that the Harbour Bridge crossing was first used, becoming the first sports event to cross the Auckland Harbour Bridge.

The Harbour Bridge crossing was the brainchild of Rendell McIntosh, a 1974 British Commonwealth Games 400 metres hurdles competitor. Together with Paul Ryken, as Race Director, they planned and implemented the first event on the 25 October 1992. The initial bridge crossing event attracted over 3,000 entrants, had 500 accredited media and a budget of $450,000.

In September 2006, the Auckland marathon course was officially measured by approved measurer Bob Braid. This means an athlete's time over the 2006 marathon course can be recognised to qualify for international events such as the World Championships in Athletics.

Course 

The course begins in the seaside suburb of Devonport on the North Shore and travels through Takapuna and Northcote before crossing the Harbour Bridge and heading towards the finish line at Victoria Park.

While the half marathon runners complete their race at Victoria Park, those competing in the full marathon continue eastward through Viaduct Harbour and along Tamaki Drive to the turn-around point at Saint Heliers Bay. The marathon then returns along Tamaki Drive and back to Victoria Park.

Winners 

Key: Course record (in bold)

Notes

References

External links 
 Auckland Marathon Official Site

Marathons in New Zealand
Sport in Auckland
Spring (season) events in New Zealand
Events in Auckland
Waitematā Harbour